Xioczana Milagros Canales Porras (born 21 April 1999) is a Peruvian footballer who plays as a midfielder for Spanish Primera Nacional club UCD La Cañada Atlético and the Peru women's national team.

International career
Canales represented Peru at the 2014 South American U-20 Women's Championship, the 2016 South American U-17 Women's Championship and the 2017 Bolivarian Games. At senior level, she played Copa América Femenina (2014 and 2018).

International goals

References

1999 births
Living people
Women's association football midfielders
Women's association football forwards
Peruvian women's footballers
Peru women's international footballers
Sport Boys footballers
Peruvian expatriate footballers
Peruvian expatriate sportspeople in Spain
Expatriate women's footballers in Spain